Delroy Bertram Taylor (born 30 June 1975) is a former Jamaican cricketer. Taylor was a right-handed batsman who bowled right-arm medium pace. He was born in St Catherine, Jamaica.

Having played Youth Test and Youth One Day Internationals for West Indies Under-19s, Taylor made a single first-class appearance for Jamaica against the touring English county of Lancashire in 1996. In this match, he took the wicket of Michael Atherton in Lancashire's first-innings for the cost of 65 runs from 10 overs, while in Lancashire's second-innings he took the wicket of Warren Hegg for the cost of 35 runs from 7 overs. In Jamaicas first-innings, Taylor scored 60 runs before he was dismissed by Mike Watkinson, while in their second-innings he was dismissed by the same bowler for 20. Despite what was a fairly successful debut, Taylor made no further appearances for Jamaica in any format.

Later in 2003, while he studying at Durham University in England for his degree, Taylor made a single first-class appearance for Durham UCCE against Nottinghamshire. In this match, he scored 82 runs in the university's first-innings, before being dismissed by Paul Franks, while in their second-innings the same bowler dismissed him for a single run. In that same season, he made a single first-class appearance for British Universities against the touring Zimbabweans. In this match, he was dismissed in the teams first-innings for 16 runs by Douglas Hondo, while in their second-innings the same bowler dismissed him for 27 runs.

References

External links
Delroy Taylor at ESPNcricinfo
Delroy Taylor at CricketArchive

1975 births
Living people
People from Saint Catherine Parish
Alumni of Durham University
Jamaican cricketers
Durham MCCU cricketers
Jamaica cricketers
British Universities cricketers